Lorenzo M. Lynch (born April 6, 1963 in Oakland, California) is a former American professional football player. A 5'9", 197 lbs. cornerback from Sacramento State, Lynch played in 11 NFL seasons for three teams. In his NFL career, he had 17 interceptions for 315 yards and 2 touchdowns.

In the pregame show for the NFL Network's presentation of Thursday Night Football on September 20, 2012, former Cowboys receiver Michael Irvin recalled a game he played against Lynch (then playing for the Phoenix Cardinals) 20 years earlier on September 20, 1992. He quoted Lynch as stating before the game, "I'll be with you all day, Michael." Irvin went on to have one of his best games (in terms of numbers), catching for 210 yards and 3 touchdowns.

His nephew Marshawn Lynch is a running back who compiled more than 10,000 yards rushing for the Buffalo Bills, Oakland Raiders (now Las Vegas Raiders), and Seattle Seahawks. He is also related to quarterback Josh Johnson, who has played for 14 different NFL franchises and is currently with the San Francisco 49ers.

References

External links
 Database Football

American football cornerbacks
American football safeties
Sacramento State Hornets football players
Players of American football from Oakland, California
Chicago Bears players
Phoenix Cardinals players
Arizona Cardinals players
Oakland Raiders players
1963 births
Living people
National Football League replacement players